Ruslan Kurbanov (born February 10, 1993) is an Uzbekistani triple jumper, born in Samarkand. He competed at the 2016 Summer Olympics in the men's triple jump but did not have a mark in the qualifying round.

References

1993 births
Living people
People from Samarkand
Uzbekistani male triple jumpers
Olympic athletes of Uzbekistan
Athletes (track and field) at the 2016 Summer Olympics
Athletes (track and field) at the 2020 Summer Olympics
Athletes (track and field) at the 2014 Asian Games
Athletes (track and field) at the 2018 Asian Games
Medalists at the 2018 Asian Games
Asian Games silver medalists for Uzbekistan
Asian Games medalists in athletics (track and field)
Olympic male triple jumpers
Asian Athletics Championships winners